Gigot is a French surname. Notable people with the surname include:

Edward Gigot (1847–1928), German-born Canadian merchant and politician
Francis Gigot (1859–1920), French Roman Catholic priest
François Gigot de la Peyronie (1678–1747), French surgeon
Maurice-Joseph-Louis Gigot d'Elbée (1752–1794), French Royalist military leader
Paul Gigot, American political commentator and editor
Tony Gigot (born 1990), French rugby league player
Samuel Gigot (born 1993), French football player

See also
Gigot (film), American film

French-language surnames